Films produced in Norway before 1930:

1900s

1910s

1920s

External links
 Norwegian film sorted by release date at the Internet Movie Database

1900s
Norwegian
Films
Norwegian
Films
Norwegian
Films